The 2016 Mountain West Conference football season was the 18th season of college football for the Mountain West Conference (MW). In the 2016 NCAA Division I FBS football season, the MW had 12 football members: Air Force, Boise State, Colorado State, Fresno State, Hawaii, Nevada, New Mexico, San Diego State, San Jose State, UNLV, Utah State, and Wyoming.

Pre-season

Mountain West Media
2016 Mountain West Football Media Days were held on July 26 & 27 at the Cosmopolitan on the Las Vegas Strip.

Preseason polls
Reference:

First place votes in parenthesis

Preseason All-Mountain West Teams
Reference:

Preseason Offensive Player of the Year:
Donnel Pumphrey, SR., RB, San Diego State
Preseason Defensive Player of the Year:
Damontae Kazee, SR., DB, San Diego State
Preseason Special Teams Player of the Year:
Rashaad Penny, JR., KR, San Diego State

(* - member of the 2015 All-Mountain West first team)

(** - member of the 2015 All-Mountain West second team)

Award watch lists
The following Mountain West players were named to preseason award watch lists.

Maxwell Award:
Jacobi Owens–Air Force
Jeremy McNichols–Boise State
Brett Rypien–Boise State
Donnel Pumphrey–San Diego State
Brian Hill–Wyoming

Chuck Bednarik Award:
Damontae Kazee–San Diego State
Calvin Munson–San Diego State

John Mackey Award:
Jake Roh–Boise State
Jarred Gipson–Nevada
Billy Freeman–San Jose State
Wyatt Houston–Utah State

Rimington Trophy:
Jake Bennett–Colorado State
Asotui Eli–Hawai'i
Nathan Goltry–Nevada
Arthur Flores–San Diego State
Will Kreitler–UNLV
Austin Stephens–Utah State

Lou Groza Award:
Tyler Rausa–Boise State
Brent Zuzo–Nevada

Ray Guy Award:
Hayden Hunt–Colorado State
Alex Boy–Nevada
Michael Carrizosa–San Jose State
Ethan Wood–Wyoming

Bronko Nagurski Trophy:
Weston Steelhammer–Air Force
Tanner Vallejo–Boise State
Calvin Munson–San Diego State

Outland Trophy:
Fred Zerblis–Colorado State
Austin Corbett–Nevada
Nico Siragusa–San Diego State
Chase Roullier–Wyoming

Jim Thorpe Award:
Roland Ladipo–Air Force
Weston Steelhammer–Air Force
Damontae Kazee–San Diego State
Andrew Wingard–Wyoming

Butkus Award:
Tanner Vallejo–Boise State
Kevin Davis–Colorado State
Calvin Munson–San Diego State

Fred Biletnikoff Award:
Thomas Sperbeck–Boise State
Hasaan Henderson–Nevada
Jerico Richardson–Nevada
Devonte Boyd–UNLV

Wuerffel Trophy:
Zack Golditch–Colorado State
Jeremy Maculey–Nevada
Daniel Brunskill–San Diego State
Tim Crawley–San Jose State
Travis Seefeldt–Utah State

Davey O'Brien Award:
Brett Rypien–Boise State

Doak Walker Award:
Jacobi Owens–Air Force
Paul Harris–Hawai'i
James Butler–Nevada
Donnel Pumphrey–San Diego State
Devante Mays–Utah State
Brian Hill–Wyoming

Walter Camp Award:
Brett Rypien–Boise State
Donnel Pumphrey–San Diego State

Paul Hornung Award:
Rashaad Penny–San Diego State
Tim Crawley–San Jose State

Coaches
NOTE: Stats shown are before the beginning of the season

Rankings

Championship game

The Championship Game was played between the San Diego State Aztecs, champions of the West Division, and the Wyoming Cowboys, champions of the Mountain Division, on December 3, 2016, at War Memorial Stadium in Laramie, Wyoming. The Aztecs won 27–24, repeating as champions. Running back Rashaad Penny of San Diego State was the offensive MVP, and defensive back Damontae Kazee of San Diego State was the defensive MVP.

Bowl games

Mountain West vs Power Conference matchups

Records against other conferences
2016 records against non-conference foes:

Regular Season

Post Season

Awards and honors

All Conference teams

Offensive Player of the Year: Donnel Pumphrey, SR., RB, San Diego State
Defensive Player of the Year: Damontae Kazee, SR., DB, San Diego State
Special Teams Player of the Year: Rashaad Penny, JR., KR, San Diego State
Freshman of the Year: Logan Wilson, LB, Wyoming
Coach of the Year: Craig Bohl, Wyoming

Offense:

Defense:

(* – Two-Time First-Team Selection)(** – Three-Time First-Team Selection)(*** – Two-Time Second-Team Selection)

Honorable Mentions:
Air Force: Haji Dunn, Sr., LB; Tim McVey, Jr., KR; Colin Sandor, Sr., OL; Dylan Vail, Sr., OL.
Boise State: Steven Baggett, Sr., OL; Mason Hampton, Jr., OL; Tanner Vallejo, Sr., LB; Cedrick Wilson, Jr., WR.
Colorado State: Nick Callender, Sr., OL; Nick Stevens, Jr., QB; Paul Thurston, Sr., OL.
Fresno State: Stratton Brown, Sr., DB; KeeSean Johnson, So., WR; Kody Kroening, Jr., P.
Hawai'i: Trayvon Henderson, Jr., DB; Marcus Kemp, Sr., WR; Leo Koloamatangi, Sr., OL; Meffy Koloamatangi, Jr., DL; Jalen Rogers, Sr., DB; Rigoberto Sanchez, Sr., PK/P.
Nevada: James Butler, Jr., RB; Wyatt Demps, Jr., WR; Asauni Rufus, So., DB.
New Mexico: Dakota Cox, Sr., LB; Daniel Henry, Sr., DB; Aaron Jenkins, So., OL; Jason Sanders, Jr., PK.
San Diego State: Kyle Kelley, Sr., DL; Quest Truxton, Jr., PR.
San Jose State: Michael Carrizosa, Jr., P; Isaiah Irving, Sr., DL; Jeremiah Kolone, Jr., OL; Maurice McKnight, Jr., DB; Christian Tago, Sr., LB.
UNLV: Troy Hawthorne, Sr., DB; Mike Hughes, Jr., DL; Nathan Jacobson, So., OL; Will Kreitler, Sr., OL; Torry McTyer, Sr., DB.
Utah State: Austin Albrecht, Sr., OL; Ricky Ali'ifua, Sr., DL; Wyatt Houston, Sr., TE; Jake Simonich, Sr., OL; Austin Stephens, Sr., OL.
Wyoming: Lucas Wacha, Sr., LB

Home game attendance

Bold – Exceed capacity
†Season High

References